The Gloucester Net and Twine Company is a historic factory in Gloucester, Massachusetts.  It was the factory of one of Gloucester's most importing fishing-related manufacturing businesses, founded in 1884.  The complex was built c. 1899.  The main factory building is a utilitarian wood-frame structure three stories high, six window bays wide and fourteen long.  Its long facade, along Maplewood Avenue, is centered on a four-story tower, to the right of which is a single story brick power supply building with Italianate detailing.

The complex was listed on the National Register of Historic Places in 1996.

See also
National Register of Historic Places listings in Gloucester, Massachusetts
National Register of Historic Places listings in Essex County, Massachusetts

References

Industrial buildings and structures on the National Register of Historic Places in Massachusetts
Buildings and structures in Gloucester, Massachusetts
National Register of Historic Places in Essex County, Massachusetts